Serapio may refer to:

Ancient history
 Publius Cornelius Scipio Nasica Serapio (182/181–132 BC), Ancient Roman politician

Modern history

Surname
 Antonio Serapio, Philippine lawmaker
 Kevin Serapio, Nicaraguan football player

Given name
 José Serapio Palimino Gomez, better known as "Pepper Gomez", American wrestler and bodybuilder
 Serapio Bwemi Magambo, Ugandan priest
 Serapio Calderón, Peruvian interim president
 Serapio Reyes Ortiz, ninth Vice-President of Bolivia
 Serapio Rukundo, Ugandan politician

See also
Serapion (disambiguation)
Seraphin (disambiguation)